The 1986–87 Wisconsin Badgers men's basketball team represented the University of Wisconsin as a member of the Big Ten Conference during the 1986–87 NCAA Division I men's basketball season.

Roster

Schedule and results

|-
!colspan=8| Regular Season
|-

References

Wisconsin Badgers men's basketball seasons
Wisconsin
Wisconsin Badgers men's basketball
Wisconsin Badgers men's basketball